is a Japanese photographer.

References

External links
 Official site

Japanese photographers
1944 births
Living people
People from Kitakyushu